The Puerto Rican crested toad (Peltophryne lemur), or simply Puerto Rican toad, is a species of toad found only in Puerto Rico and the Virgin Islands. It is the only species of toad native to Puerto Rico and the Virgin Islands. The species formerly occurred in Virgin Gorda and along the southern and northern karst in Puerto Rico. It is listed as a threatened by the US Fish and Wildlife Service due to habitat loss and introduced species. At one period of time it was believed to be extinct until it was rediscovered in 1966. The IUCN has the species listed as endangered.

Conservation

The U.S. Fish and Wildlife Service, the Department of Natural and Environmental Resources, and the American Association of Zoos and Aquariums have worked together to create a captive breeding program run by the American Association of Zoos and Aquariums. In 2013, the group released 71,000 tadpoles and 520 toadlets across three locations. The group has released 260,000 tadpoles over the last twenty years.
 
In 2019, another 8,000 tadpoles were sent to Puerto Rico from the Detroit Zoological Society.

In November 2019 the first Puerto Rican crested toad was born as a result of in vitro.

See also
 Puerto Rico Zoological Society

References

Peltophryne
Amphibians of Puerto Rico
Fauna of the British Virgin Islands
Amphibians of the United States Virgin Islands
Amphibians described in 1869